Christiane Martel (born Christiane Magnani on 18 January 1936) is a French actress and beauty queen. She became the second woman to win Miss Universe, in 1953. She was the only French woman to hold the Miss Universe title until Iris Mittenaere in 2016.

Martel was born in Nancy to a modest family of Italian ancestry. She was Miss Châtellerault in 1952. She was crowned Miss Cinémonde and represented France at Miss Universe 1953 where she became the second Miss Universe. She was crowned by actress, Julie Adams as Miss Universe 1952, Armi Kuusela of Finland gave up her crown.

Martel's runners-up in the 1953 pageant was Myrna Hansen of the USA, followed by delegates of Japan, Mexico, and Australia.

Shortly after her reign, Martel embarked on a successful career in international films, appearing in movies such as Yankee Pasha, So This Is Paris, Drop the Curtain, the 1956 version of Corazón salvaje (playing the villain Aimée), Viva el Amor!, Rosa Blanca and her last film to date, 1961's Leoni al Sole.

Martel was married briefly to Ronnie Marengo, a department store heir, whom she divorced in 1955. In 1961 she married Miguel Alemán Velasco, who would become Governor of Veracruz and is the son of Miguel Alemán Valdés, former president of Mexico. They have three daughters and one son. Their son, Miguel Alemán Magnani is a stakeholder of Televisa and the owner of low-cost airline, Interjet.

She made recent television appearances at the Miss Universe pageants in 1989, 1993, and 2007 that were held in Mexico. She was a celebrity judge at the Miss Universe 1978 pageant. Her last television  appearance in France was on 3 December 2011 at the Miss France pageant. She appeared in a Mexican TV Show called Sale el sol  in 2017 where she was interviewed.

References

External links

 

1936 births
20th-century French actresses
Actresses from Paris
French beauty pageant winners
French emigrants to Mexico
French female models
French film actresses
French people of Italian descent
Living people
Miss Universe 1953 contestants
Miss Universe winners